Holton USD 336 is a public unified school district headquartered in Holton, Kansas, United States.  The district includes the communities of Holton, Denison, and nearby rural areas.

Schools
The school district operates the following schools:
 Holton High School
 Holton Middle School
 Holton Elementary School
 Fresh Start

See also
 North Jackson USD 335 - school district nouth of USD 336
 Kansas State Department of Education
 Kansas State High School Activities Association
 List of high schools in Kansas
 List of unified school districts in Kansas

References

External links
 

School districts in Kansas